Beech Hill is a small village and civil parish in Berkshire, England. It is in the south east of the West Berkshire unitary authority area and bounds Hampshire and Wokingham district.

Etymology
Beech Hill is a Norman name derived from the family of De La Bec, usually resident at Aldworth, but who also had a home at Beaumys Castle, just over the parish boundary in Swallowfield.

Geography
Beech Hill stretches from the River Loddon, just west of the A33 in the east, to Trunkwell in the west and to Clappers Farm in the north, and to the Hampshire border, above Fair Cross, in the south. The village sits on a small hill above the Loddon Valley at the junction of Beech Hill Road and Wood Lane. The Foudry Brook, a tributary of the River Kennet, and the Reading–Basingstoke railway line, run through the north of the parish.

Natural conservation areas
The Stanford End Mill and River Loddon site of Special Scientific Interest (SSSI) is partially within the parish, just to the south east of the village.

History
The Camlet Way - the Roman Road which runs south-west from Verulamium, modern St. Albans - joins the Devil's Highway at Fair Cross on Beech Hill's southern border and continues on westward to Calleva Atrebatum, modern Silchester.  On the Beech Hill side is The Priory, a 17th-century house on the site of Stratfield Saye Priory which was founded on the site of an old hermitage in 1170 and dissolved in 1399. Beech Hill House, of 1720, stands on the eastern side of the village. It is a Grade II listed building. Trunkwell House, on the west side, was originally the Tudor home of the Noyes family, the current English country house at Trunkwell was built in 1878 for a successful local business family and is now a hotel and restaurant. It is associated with the local pub, The Elm Tree Inn. The Church of England parish church of St Mary the Virgin was built in 1867 by William Butterfield and is Grade II* listed.

Transport

Governance
Beech Hill was originally part of the parish of Stratfield Saye, a cross-county-border parish, most of which was in Hampshire. The part in Berkshire became a civil parish in its own right in 1894. In the 16th century, it was part of the hundred of Theale, but was later transferred to the hundred of Reading which effectively ceased to function after 1886. By 1875, Beech Hill had become part of the Bradfield rural sanitary district which, in 1894, became the Bradfield Rural District. From 1974 to 1998, it was part of the district of Newbury which is now the West Berkshire unitary authority. It is represented at Westminster by the MP for Wokingham.

Demography

See also
 List of civil parishes in Berkshire

References

External links

Beech Hill Village Web Site
Royal Berkshire History: Beech Hill
Beech Hill Memorial Hall Web Site
The Elm Tree Web Site

Villages in Berkshire
West Berkshire District
Civil parishes in Berkshire